Bidesh Tukaram Kulkarni (1909-1988) was an Indian politician. He was the fourth Lieutenant Governor of Puducherry. He was elected to the Rajya Sabha, upper house of the Parliament of India from  Maharashtra as a member of the Indian National Congress.

References

Rajya Sabha members from Maharashtra
Lieutenant Governors of Puducherry
1909 births
1988 deaths